Dr Anant Nagarkatte (born 4 September 1948) is an Indian actor whose predominant contribution has been in Kannada cinema.  He has acted in over 300 films which include over 200 Kannada films as well as Hindi, Telugu, Marathi, Malayalam and English films. He has featured in theatre plays, parallel cinema and television shows.

Nag made his feature film debut through Sankalpa (1973) directed by Prof. P.V Nanjaraj Urs. Sankalpa went on to win seven state awards in Karnataka. His foray into parallel cinema was through Shyam Benegal's Ankur (1974). His commercially successful Kannada films have been Bayalu Daari (1976), Kanneshwara Rama (1977), Naa Ninna Bidalaare (1979), Chandanada Gombe (1979), Benkiya Bale (1983), Hendthige Helbedi (1989), Ganeshana Maduve (1990), Gowri Ganesha (1991), Mungaru Male (2006), Godhi Banna Sadharana Mykattu (2016), Raajakumara (2017), Sarkari Hi. Pra. Shaale, Kasaragodu, Koduge: Ramanna Rai (2018), K.G.F: Chapter 1 (2018) and Gaalipata 2 (2022).

He acted in Malgudi Days, a Doordarshan aired television series based on the stories of R. K. Narayan. He is a recipient of six Filmfare Awards South and five Karnataka State Film Awards. He is the elder brother of acclaimed director and actor Shankar Nag.

Early life
Anant Nag was born in a Konkani-speaking family on 4 September 1948 to Anandi and Sadanand Nagarkatte in Shirali, Bhatkal taluk, Karnataka where he spent most of his childhood. He has an elder sister, Shyamala and his younger brother was Shankar Nag.

Nag did his early schooling in a Catholic school in Ajjarkad, Udupi, Ananda Ashrama in Dakshina Kannada and Chitrapur Math in Uttara Kannada districts of the erstwhile Mysore state (now Karnataka). In class 9th standard, he was sent to Mumbai for further study. He attempted to join the armed services but was rejected by the Army for being underweight and by the Air Force for poor eyesight. He was drawn towards the theatre movement of Mumbai and he was selected to act in Konkani, Kannada and Marathi-language plays which he did until he turned 22.

Career

Theatre
Anant Nag began his career with Kannada and Konkani plays in Mumbai. He went on to work in plays of Satyadev Dubey, Girish Karnad and Amol Palekar. For a period of about five years, he acted in Konkani, Kannada, Marathi and Hindi plays.

Film and television

Following a theatre career in Mumbai, Nag made his film debut with Sankalpa, a 1973 Kannada film. He then grew to become a core part of parallel cinema, which was at its peak in the 1970s and 1980s. Being introduced to director Shyam Benegal by theatre director Satyadev Dubey, he starred in six of Benegal's films: Ankur (1974), Nishant (1975), Manthan (1976), Bhumika (1978), Kondura (1978) and Kalyug (1981).

Nag's arrival into Kannada films was through G. V. Iyer's Hamsageethe (1975), in which he played the role of a disciple of carnatic singing. The film went on to win the National Film Award for Best Feature Film in Kannada.

Nag appeared in thirteen episodes of the television series, Malgudi Days, an adaptation of R. K. Narayan's short stories of the same name, directed by his brother Shankar.

Nag's portrayal of an Alzheimer's patient in Godhi Banna Sadharana Mykattu (2016) has received critical acclaim and contributed to making this experimental film, a commercial success. In the comedy-drama Gaalipata 2 (2022), he played Kishore, a Kannada-language professor. Muralidhara Khajaneof The Hindu felt his "fantastic portrayal as a teacher and Ganesh's sentimental turn are the hallmarks of this film".

Personal life 
Nag married Gayatri on 9 April 1987.

Political career
He was an MLC, MLA and a minister in J. H. Patel government. He served as Bangalore Urban Development minister. 
In 2004, he unsuccessfully contested the Chamarajpet constituency, Bangalore assembly election from Janata Dal (Secular). He was pitched against then Chief Minister of Karnataka, S. M. Krishna from Indian National Congress and fellow actor Mukhyamantri Chandru from Bharatiya Janata Party. On 22 February 2023  BJP, Karnataka state unit organised a programme in the presence of state president Nalin Kumar Kateel
 where Anant Nag is said to join BJP but he didn't attend the programme later programme was cancelled.

Filmography

Awards

References

External links

 Anant Nag on Filmibeat.com

Politicians from Bangalore
Indian actor-politicians
Male actors in Kannada cinema
Indian male film actors
Living people
Filmfare Awards South winners
1948 births
People from Uttara Kannada
Kannada male actors
Male actors from Bangalore
20th-century Indian male actors
21st-century Indian male actors
Recipients of the Rajyotsava Award 2007